Hubert Long (December 3, 1923 – September 7, 1972) was an American music executive known for his promotion of country music artists from the early 1950s to his death in 1972. Long created a talent agency named for him in 1952 and one of Nashville's first independent talent agencies, Stable of Stars, three years later. A founding board member of the Country Music Association (CMA) and the Country Music Foundation (CMF), Long was posthumously inducted into the Country Music Hall of Fame in 1979.

Early life
Long was born in Poteet, Texas, but grew up in Freer where he graduated from high school in 1942. Long served in the United States Navy from 1942 to 1945 before returning to Corpus Christi, Texas to work in a record store. In 1946, Long moved to San Antonio to work for Decca Records. When Long's supervisor left Decca for RCA Records, he followed. While at RCA, Long would meet Colonel Tom Parker, who hired him to do publicity work for Eddy Arnold. It was while he was managing Arnold that Long would move to Nashville and get into the promotional business.

Move to Nashville
Despite moving to Nashville with Parker, Long would be named manager of the Louisiana Hayride in Shreveport in 1950. While with the Louisiana Hayride, Long would sign both Webb Pierce and Faron Young to management contracts. To help better management his growing list of stars, Long established the Hubert Long Agency in Nashville in 1952 for talent bookings and then the Stable of Stars in 1955 which was one of Nashville's first independent talent agencies.

Other businesses established in Nashville
By 1959, Long formed his first music publishing business, Moss Rose, and was also responsible for the construction of Nashville's SESAC Building. The following year, Long's business had expanded beyond the United States into the United Kingdom, Japan, Australia, South Africa, and several other European countries. By 1964, Long's talent and music publishing businesses were firmly entrenched in Nashville's Music Row, with his office right next to Columbia Records recording studios  (now part of Sony Music Nashville.) Among the stars under his agency included Skeeter Davis, Ray Price, Chet Atkins, Little Jimmy Dickens, Ferlin Husky, Don Gibson, Bill Anderson, Jan Howard, Mel Tillis, and Brenda Lee. Long stated in 1964 that "Business looks good. It certainly looks good to me. I see a continually growing future in this industry and as long we are good to it, it will be good to us." Parker was also given praise from Long in that same article along with adding more space to his rapidly growing business.

At the time of his 1972 death, Long also owned an advertising agency and three additional music publishing firms.

Role in establishing CMA and CMF
Long would be a founding member of the CMA and the CMF in the late 1950s, becoming the president of both organizations. Long served as secretary of the CMA when it was founded in 1958. He served as CMA President in 1968 and was its Chairman in 1972 when he had medical issues.

Illness and death
In March 1972, Long was admitted to a hospital in Nashville for surgery to remove a brain tumor (Source listed it incorrectly as 1982.). The surgery was not successful in removing the tumor, and Long died on September 7, 1972 in Nashville. Long was survived by his mother, two sisters, two brothers, one niece, and five nephews (His father had died two years earlier.). Funeral services were held two days later in Nashville with honorary pallbearers including Nashville Mayor Beverly Briley, Jerry Bradley, Jo Walker-Meador (listed as Jo Walker), Frances Preston, Howard, Ken Nelson, Huskey, Tex Ritter, Arnold, Parker, Bud Wendell, Atkins, Jack Stapp, Young, and Jimmie Davis while actual pallbearers included were Anderson and Owen Bradley (All names mentioned except for Briley, Howard, and Parker are Country Music Hall of Fame inductees as of 2020.).

Long was buried at Spring Hill Cemetery in Nashville.

Legacy
In 1979, Long would be posthumously inducted into the Country Music Hall of Fame. Joining Long that year would be Hank Snow.

References

External links
 Country Music Hall of Fame profile of Long.

1923 births
1972 deaths
American music industry executives
Country Music Hall of Fame inductees
Deaths from brain cancer in the United States
Deaths from cancer in Tennessee
Businesspeople from San Antonio
People from Atascosa County, Texas
People from Duval County, Texas
People from Nueces County, Texas
People from Shreveport, Louisiana
United States Navy sailors
United States Navy personnel of World War II
20th-century American businesspeople